Portugal participated in the Eurovision Song Contest 2022 in Turin, Italy, with "" performed by Maro. The Portuguese broadcaster  (RTP) organised the national final  2022 in order to select the Portuguese entry for the 2022 contest. After two semi-finals and a final which took place in March 2022, "" performed by Maro emerged as the winner after achieving the highest score following the combination of votes from seven regional juries and a public televote.

Portugal was drawn to compete in the first semi-final of the Eurovision Song Contest which took place on 10 May 2022. Performing during the show in position 10, "" was announced among the top 10 entries of the first semi-final and therefore qualified to compete in the final on 14 May. It was later revealed that Portugal placed fourth out of the 17 participating countries in the semi-final with 208 points. In the final, Portugal performed in position 3 and placed ninth out of the 25 participating countries with 207 points.

Background 

Prior to the 2022 contest, Portugal has participated in the Eurovision Song Contest fifty-two times since its first entry in 1964. Following the introduction of semi-finals for the 2004, Portugal had featured in only six finals. Portugal has also received nul points on two occasions; in 1964 and 1997.

The Portuguese national broadcaster,  (RTP), broadcasts the event within Portugal and organises the selection process for the nation's entry. RTP confirmed Portugal's participation in the 2022 Eurovision Song Contest on 8 September 2021. Along with their participation confirmation, the broadcaster revealed details regarding their selection procedure and announced the organization of  2022 in order to select the 2022 Portuguese entry.

Before Eurovision

Festival da Canção 2022 

 2022 was the 56th edition of  that selected Portugal's entry for the Eurovision Song Contest 2022. Twenty entries competed in the competition that consisted of two semi-finals held on 5 and 7 March 2022 leading to a ten-song final on 12 March 2022. All three shows of the competition took place at RTP's Studio 1 in Lisbon and were broadcast on RTP1 and RTP Internacional as well as on radio via Antena 1 and online via RTP Play. The shows were also broadcast on RTP Acessibilidades with presentation in Portuguese Sign Language and in Spain on Ten and tvG2, the latter with Galician commentary by Moncho Lemos and Xosé Manuel Martín, as well as online via RTVE Play.

Format 
The format of the competition consisted of three shows: two semi-finals on 5 and 7 March 2022 and the final on 12 March 2022. Each semi-final featured ten competing entries from which five advanced from each show to complete the ten song lineup in the final. Results during the semi-finals were determined by the 50/50 combination of votes from a jury panel appointed by RTP and public televoting, while results during the final were determined by the 50/50 combination of votes from seven regional juries and public televoting, which was opened following the second semi-final and closed during the final show. Both the public televote and the juries assigned points from 1–8, 10 and 12 based on the ranking developed by both streams of voting.

Competing entries 
Twenty composers were selected by RTP through two methods: sixteen invited by RTP for the competition and four selected from over 600 submissions received through an open call for songs. The composers, which both created the songs and selected its performers, were required to submit the demo and final versions of their entries by 31 October and 30 November 2021, respectively. Songs could be submitted in any language. The selected composers were revealed on 4 November 2021, while the competing artists and songs were revealed on 21 January 2022.

Shows

Semi-finals 
The two semi-finals took place on 5 and 7 March 2022. The first semi-final was hosted by Jorge Gabriel and Sónia Araújo while the second semi-final was hosted by Tânia Ribas de Oliveira and José Carlos Malato. In each semi-final ten entries competed and five advanced to the final based on the 50/50 combination of votes of a jury panel consisting of Dulce Pontes, Dino D'Santiago, Surma, Teresa Salgueiro, Pedro Granger, Miguel Cadete and Tatanka, and a public televote. In addition to the performances of the competing entries, Rita Redshoes, Expensive Soul, Rui Pregal da Cunha and  The Black Mamba performed as guests in the first semi-final, while The Legendary Tigerman, Samuel Úria, Capitão Fausto, Lena d'Água,  and  José Cid, and  Chanel performed as guests in the second semi-final.

Final 
The ten entries that qualified from the two preceding semi-finals competed and the winner, "" performed by Maro, was selected based on the 50/50 combination of votes of seven regional juries and a public televote. In addition to the performances of the competing entries, Bateu Matou, Blaya, Lura, Sara Correia, and B Fachada together with Benjamim, Selma Uamusse and Tiago Bettencourt performed as the interval acts.

Ratings

At Eurovision 

According to Eurovision rules, all nations with the exceptions of the host country and the "Big Five" (France, Germany, Italy, Spain and the United Kingdom) are required to qualify from one of two semi-finals in order to compete for the final; the top ten countries from each semi-final progress to the final. The European Broadcasting Union (EBU) split up the competing countries into six different pots based on voting patterns from previous contests, with countries with favourable voting histories put into the same pot. On 25 January 2022, an allocation draw was held which placed each country into one of the two semi-finals, as well as which half of the show they would perform in. Portugal was placed into the first semi-final, which was held on 10 May 2022, and was scheduled to perform in the second half of the show.

Once all the competing songs for the 2022 contest had been released, the running order for the semi-finals was decided by the shows' producers rather than through another draw, so that similar songs were not placed next to each other. Immediately after the close of the first semi-final, a press conference was held in which each of the artists drew the half of the final of which they would perform in.

In Portugal, all shows were broadcast on RTP1, RTP Internacional and RTP África, with commentary by Nuno Galopim. The Portuguese spokesperson, who announced the top 12-point score awarded by the Portuguese jury during the final, was Pedro Tatanka, who previously represented Portugal in the Eurovision Song Contest 2021 as part of The Black Mamba.

Semi-final
Maro took part in technical rehearsals on 1 and 5 May, followed by dress rehearsals on 9 and 10 May. This included the jury show on 9 May where the professional juries of each country watched and voted on the competing entries.

The Portuguese performance featured Maro and five backing singers encircled around a smoke-floored stage with intricate patterns in the background. The five backing vocalists were Diana Castro, Milhanas, Carolina Leite, Beatriz Fonseca and Beatriz Pessoa.

At the end of the show, Portugal was announced as having finished in the top 10 and subsequently qualifying for the grand final. This marked the second consecutive qualification to the final for Portugal. It was later revealed that Maro placed fourth in the semi-final, receiving a total of 208 points: 87 points from the televoting and 121 points from the juries.

Final
Shortly after the first semi-final, a winners' press conference was held for the ten qualifying countries. As part of this press conference, the qualifying artists took part in a draw to determine which half of the grand final they would subsequently participate in. This draw was done in the order the countries appeared in the semi-final running order. Portugal was drawn to compete in the first half. Following this draw, the shows' producers decided upon the running order of the final, as they had done for the semi-finals.

Maro once again took part in dress rehearsals on 13 and 14 May before the final, including the jury final where the professional juries cast their final votes before the live show. She performed a repeat of her semi-final performance during the final on 14 May. Portugal placed ninth in the final, scoring 207 points: 36 points from the televoting and 171 points from the juries.

Voting 

Below is a breakdown of points awarded to Portugal during the first semi-final and final. Voting during the three shows involved each country awarding two sets of points from 1-8, 10 and 12: one from their professional jury and the other from televoting. The exact composition of the professional jury, and the results of each country's jury and televoting were released after the final; the individual results from each jury member were also released in an anonymised form. The Portuguese jury consisted of Cláudia Pascoal, who represented Portugal in the Eurovision Song Contest 2018, Joana Espadinha, Paulo Castelo, Pedro Granger, and Rita Guerra, who represented Portugal in the Eurovision Song Contest 2003. In the first semi-final, Portugal finished in fourth place out of seventeen entries, marking Portugal's second consecutive qualification to the grand final.

Points awarded to Portugal

Points awarded by Portugal

Detailed voting results
The following members comprised the Portuguese jury:
 Cláudia Pascoal - Singer-songwriter, represented Portugal in the Eurovision Song Contest 2018
 Joana Espadinha - Singer-songwriter
 Paulo Castelo – Lyricist, songwriter, music producer
 Pedro Granger – Actor
 Rita Guerra – singer, represented Portugal in the Eurovision Song Contest 2003

References

External links 
 

2022
Countries in the Eurovision Song Contest 2022
Eurovision